Miquel Creus i Muñoz alias Miquel Desclot (Barcelona, 1952) is a Spanish writer and translator known for his Catalan translations of works by Dante, Petrarca or Michelangelo Buonarroti. He was one of the founders of the Catalan literary collective, Ofèlia Dracs around 1976.

Awards
1971 Premi Amadeu Oller de poesia Ira és trista passió
1985 Premi Josep Maria de Sagarra, de traducció teatral Les mamelles de Tirèsies, Guillaume Apollinaire
1985 Premi Lola Anglada, Set que no dormen a la palla
1987 Premi Pere Quart d'humor i sàtira Auques i espantalls
1988 Premi de la Generalitat a la millor traducció en vers Llibres profètics de Lambeth, I: Profecies polítiques,  William Blake
1988 Premio Nacional de traducción de literatura infantil, Versos perversos de Roald Dahl
1993 Premi Crítica Serra d'Or de memòries, Llibre de Durham
1993 Premi Crítica Serra d'Or de poesia per a infants, Bestiolari de la Clara
1996 Premi Cavall Verd Rafael Jaume de traducció poètica, Per tot coixí les herbes
1997 Premi Caixa de Girona dels Ciutat d'Olot, De llavis del gran bruixot
2000 Premi Crítica Serra d'Or de traducció, Saps la terra on floreix el llimoner: Dante, Petrarca, Michelangelo
2000 Premi Jaume Vidal i Alcover de projectes de traducció
2002 Premio Nacional de literatura infantil y juvenil, Més música, mestre!

Works

Poetry 
1971 Ira és trista passió
1974 Viatge perillós i al•lucinant a través de mil tres-cents vint-i-set versos infestats de pirates i de lladres de camí ral
1978 Cançons de la lluna al barret
1983 Juvenília
1987 Auques i espantalls
1987 Música, mestre!
1992 El llevant bufa a ponent
1992 Com si de sempre1995 Oi, Eloi?2001 Més música, mestre!2003 Menú d'astronauta2004 Bestiolari de la Clara2006 Fantasies, variacions i fugaProse
1992 Llibre de Durham1994 Montseny, temps avall1996 Veïna de pedra viva2002 Pare, saps què?2004 Muntanyes relegadesChildren's books
1971 El blanc i el negre1971 La casa de les mones1973Fava, favera1973 El gran joc dels colors1978 Itawa1980 A la punta de la llengua1980 Waïnämöïnen1983 No riu el riu1986 Què descobreix l'Atlàntida1986 Set que no dormen a la palla1988 Barraca de nas1991 Més de set que no dormen a la palla1993 La cadena d'or1994 Flordecol1995 Amors i desamors d'Oberó i Titània1995 Lluna de mel al Palau de vidre1996 Viatge inaugural a l'Antitetànic1997 La flauta màgica1997 De llavis del Gran Bruixot: els herois de Kalevala1997 La cançó més bonica del món1998 El barber de Sevilla2004 Nas de barraca2004 Aristòtil entre escombraries2004 Amor a mar2005 Les mines del rei Xang Phi Nyo2007 Des de Lapònia, amb amor2008 Pallufet & VentaflocsTheatre 
1997 Història del sultà2002 Tot esperant l'emperadorEssay 
2003 L'edat d'or de la músicaDiscography
1986 La cançó més bonica del món1994 Fills del segle2002 Transatlàntida2003 Cançó a cau d'orella2004 Un concert desconcertant''

Bibliography

External links 
www.escriptors.cat 
cultura.gencat.net

1952 births
Spanish writers
Writers from Barcelona
Translators from Catalonia
Translators to Catalan
Living people